The 2019 Abilene Christian Wildcats football team represents Abilene Christian University in the 2019 NCAA Division I FCS football season as a member of the Southland Conference. The Wildcats are led by third-year head coach Adam Dorrel and play their home games at Anthony Field at Wildcat Stadium.

Previous season
The Wildcats finished the 2018 season with a 6–5 overall record, and a 5–4 record in Southland play to finish in a four-way tie for fourth place.

Preseason

Preseason poll
The Southland Conference released their preseason poll on July 18, 2019. The Wildcats were picked to finish in seventh place.

Preseason All–Southland Teams
The Wildcats placed five players on the preseason all–Southland teams.

Offense

1st team

Billy McCrary – RB

2nd team

Josh Fink – WR

Kade Parmelly – OL

Defense

1st team

Jeremiah Chambers – LB

2nd team

Bolu Onifade – DB

Schedule

Source:

Game summaries

at North Texas

Arizona Christian

at Central Arkansas

McNeese State

at Incarnate Word

at Lamar

Houston Baptist

Stephen F. Austin

at Nicholls

Sam Houston State

Southeastern Louisiana

at Mississippi State

References

Abilene Christian
Abilene Christian Wildcats football seasons
Abilene Christian Wildcats football